The British Board of Agrément (BBA) is a UK body issuing certificates for construction products and systems and providing inspection services in support of their designers and installers.

Agrément certificate 
This is an authoritative document proving the fitness for the purpose of a construction product and its compliance or contribution to compliance with the various building regulations applying in the United Kingdom. It is commonly referred to as a 'BBA Agrément Certificate'.

History 
The forerunner of the BBA, the Agrément Board, was modelled on an arrangement operating in France, hence the French word agrément, which translates literally as 'approval'.

The British Board of Agrément (BBA) is a construction industry approvals body, originally set up in 1966 by government and offering product and installer approval. Agrément certificates cover 200 different product sectors and the largest of these are insulation and roofing. In the former the BBA has run an Approved Installer Scheme for more than thirty years, linking installations of injected cavity wall insulation to BBA approval of the systems and dealing with both the system supplier and installer. BBA approvals show compliance with Building Regulations and other requirements, including installation quality.

The BBA also inspects for the Fenestration Self Assessment Scheme (FENSA), the Federation of Master Builders and for some certificate holders to check that installers demonstrate good practice on site. The BBA also run the Highways Authorities Product Approval Scheme (HAPAS) for Highways England, County Surveyors Society and other agencies in the UK. This is similar to the Agrément Certificate process but applied to highways products. Some of these have Approved Installer schemes linked to them and the BBA also inspects those.

Structure and ownership 
The BBA consists of three main operations, Product Approval and Certification, Inspection and Test Services. Ownership of the BBA is held by its Governing Board, consisting of three executive and four non-executive directors. Inspection activities are a key element of the planned business growth and recent restructuring of the BBA’s Technical operation has been undertaken to focus effort and attention on it. Hardy Giesler is the BBA’s CEO.

The BBA employs approximately 185 people, most of whom are based at their offices and testing facilities near Watford, and the remainder are inspectors geographically located around the UK with access to the BBA’s electronic systems allowing them to work remotely.

The BBA is a company limited by guarantee - equivalent to a non-profit status used in other countries, any profits made by BBA used for the benefit of the construction industry or the public good.

Coverage 
The organisation has inspectors based around the United Kingdom capable of returning completed reports within 24 hours of receipt.

Environmental policy 
The BBA is accredited by UKAS to provide Environmental Certification to the ISO 14000 series and operates appropriate internal controls.

References

External links
 

Government agencies established in 1966
Product-testing organizations
Certification marks
Government buildings in England
Government buildings in Wales
Government buildings in Scotland
Organisations based in Hertfordshire
St Albans
1966 establishments in the United Kingdom